Arent Jacobsz. Koets (c.1600 – 1 March 1635), was a Dutch Golden Age concierge of the Haarlem schutterij.

Biography
He was a member of the St. James guild (St. Jacobsgilde), and married Guertje Henricksdr., the daughter of Henrick Lamberts and Meyntgen Thijmens. He was portrayed by Frans Hals in The Banquet of the Officers of the St George Militia Company in 1627.

On 1 March 1635 he was buried in Haarlem.

References

Arent Jacobsz. Koets in De Haarlemse Schuttersstukken, by Jhr. Mr. C.C. van Valkenburg, pp. 50–51, Haerlem : jaarboek 1961, ISSN 0927-0728, on the website of the North Holland Archives

1600s births
1635 deaths
Frans Hals
People from Haarlem